Joaquim Maria Machado de Assis, often known by his surnames as Machado de Assis, Machado, or Bruxo do Cosme Velho (21 June 1839 – 29 September 1908), was a pioneer Brazilian novelist, poet, playwright and short story writer, widely regarded as the greatest writer of Brazilian literature. Nevertheless, Assis did not achieve widespread popularity outside Brazil during his lifetime. In 1897, he founded and became the first President of the Brazilian Academy of Letters. He was multilingual, having taught himself French, English, German and Greek later in life.

Born in Morro do Livramento, Rio de Janeiro, from a poor family, he was the grandson of freed slaves in a country where slavery would not be fully abolished until 49 years later. He barely studied in public schools and never attended university. With only his own intellect and autodidactism to rely on, he struggled to rise socially. To do so, he took several public positions, passing through the Ministry of Agriculture, Trade and Public Works, and achieving early fame in newspapers where he first published his poetry and chronicles. 

Machado's work shaped the realism movement in Brazil. He became known for his wit and his eye-opening critiques of society. Generally considered to be Machado's greatest works are Dom Casmurro (1899), Memórias Póstumas de Brás Cubas ("Posthumous Memoirs of Brás Cubas", also translated as Epitaph of a Small Winner) and Quincas Borba (also known in English as Philosopher or Dog?). In 1893 he published "A Missa do Galo" ("Midnight Mass"), often considered to be the greatest short story in Brazilian literature.

Biography

Birth and adolescence

Joaquim Maria Machado de Assis was born on 21 June 1839 in Rio de Janeiro, then capital of the Empire of Brazil. His parents were Francisco José de Assis, a wall painter, the son of freed slaves, and Maria Leopoldina da Câmara Machado, a Portuguese washerwoman from the Azores. He was born in Livramento country house, owned by Dona Maria José de Mendonça Barroso Pereira, widow of senator Bento Barroso Pereira, who protected his parents and allowed them to live with her. Dona Maria José became Joaquim's godmother; her brother-in-law, commendatory Joaquim Alberto de Sousa da Silveira, was his godfather, and both were paid homage by giving their names to the baby. Machado had a sister who died young. Joaquim studied in a public school, but was not a good student. While helping to serve masses, he met Father Silveira Sarmento, who became his Latin teacher and also a good friend.

When Joaquim was ten years old, his mother died, and his father took him along as he moved to São Cristóvão. Francisco de Assis met Maria Inês da Silva, and they married in 1854. Joaquim had classes in a school for girls only, thanks to his stepmother who worked there making candies. At night he learned French with an immigrant baker. In his adolescence, he met Francisco de Paulo Brito, who owned a bookstore, a newspaper and typography. On 12 January 1855, Francisco de Paula published the poem Ela ("Her") written by Joaquim, then 15 years old, in the newspaper Marmota Fluminense. In the following year, he was hired as typographer's apprentice in the Imprensa Oficial (the Official Press, charged with the publication of Government measures), where he was encouraged as a writer by Manuel Antônio de Almeida, the newspaper's director and also a novelist. There he also met Francisco Otaviano, journalist and later liberal senator, and Quintino Bocaiúva, who decades later would become known for his role as a republican orator.

Early career and education

Francisco Otaviano hired Machado to work on the newspaper Correio Mercantil as a proofreader in 1858. He continued to write for the Marmota Fluminense and also for several other newspapers, but he did not earn much and had a humble life. As he did not live with his father anymore, it was common for him to eat only once a day for lack of money.

Around this time, he became a friend of the writer and liberal politician José de Alencar, who taught him English. From English literature, he was influenced by Laurence Sterne, William Shakespeare, Lord Byron and Jonathan Swift. He learned German years later and in his old age, Greek. He was invited by Bocaiúva to work at his newspaper Diário do Rio de Janeiro in 1860. Machado had a passion for theater and wrote several plays for a short time; his friend Bocaiúva concluded: "Your works are meant to be read and not played." He gained some notability and began to sign his writings as J. M. Machado de Assis, the way he would be known for posterity: Machado de Assis. He established himself in advanced Liberal Party circles by taking stands in defense of religious freedom and Ernest Renan's controversial Life of Jesus while attacking the venality of the clergy.

His father Francisco de Assis died in 1864. Machado learned of his father's death through acquaintances. He dedicated his compilation of poems called "Crisálidas" to his father: "To the Memory of Francisco José de Assis and Maria Leopoldina Machado de Assis, my Parents." With the Liberal Party's ascension to power about that time, Machado thought he might receive a patronage position that would help him improve his life. To his surprise, aid came from the Emperor Dom Pedro II, who hired him as director-assistant in the Diário Oficial in 1867, and knighted him as an honor. In 1888 Machado was made an officer of the Order of the Rose.

Marriage and family

In 1868 Machado met the Portuguese Carolina Augusta Xavier de Novais, five years older than him. She was the sister of his colleague Faustino Xavier de Novais, for whom he worked on the magazine O Futuro. Machado had a stammer and was extremely shy, short and lean. He was also very intelligent and well learned. He married Carolina on 12 November 1869; although her parents Miguel and Adelaide, and her siblings disapproved because Machado was of African descent and she was a white woman. They had no children.

Literature

Machado managed to rise in his bureaucratic career, first in the Agriculture Department. Three years later, he became the head of a section in it. He published two poetry books: Falenas, in 1870, and Americanas, in 1875. Their weak reception made him explore other literary genres.

He wrote five romantic novels: Ressurreição, A Mão e a Luva, Helena and Iaiá Garcia. The books were a success with the public, but literary critics considered them mediocre. Machado suffered repeated attacks of epilepsy, apparently related to hearing of the death of his old friend José de Alencar. He was left melancholic, pessimistic and fixed on death. His next book, marked by "a skeptical and realistic tone": Memórias Póstumas de Brás Cubas (Posthumous Memoirs of Brás Cubas, also translated as Epitaph of a Small Winner), is widely considered a masterpiece. By the end of the 1880s, Machado had gained wide renown as a writer.

Although he was opposed to slavery, he never spoke against it in public. He avoided discussing politics. He was criticized by the abolitionist José do Patrocínio and by the writer Lima Barreto for staying away from politics, especially the cause of abolition. He was also criticized by them for having married a white woman. Machado was caught by surprise with the monarchy overthrown on 15 November 1889. Machado had no sympathy towards republicanism, as he considered himself a liberal monarchist and venerated Pedro II, whom he perceived as "a humble, honest, well-learned and patriotic man, who knew how to make of a throne a chair [for his simplicity], without diminishing its greatness and respect." When a commission went to the public office where he worked to remove the picture of the former emperor, the shy Machado defied them: "The picture got in here by an order and it shall leave only by another order."

The birth of the Brazilian republic made Machado become more critical and an observer of the Brazilian society of his time. From then on, he wrote "not only the greatest novels of his time, but the greatest of all time of Brazilian literature." Works such as Quincas Borba (Philosopher or Dog?) (1891), Dom Casmurro (1899), Esaú e Jacó (1904) and Memorial de Aires (1908), considered masterpieces, were successes with both critics and the public. In 1893 he published "A Missa do Galo" ("Midnight Mass"), considered his greatest short story.

Later years

Machado de Assis, along with fellow monarchists such as Joaquim Nabuco, Manuel de Oliveira Lima, Afonso Celso, Viscount of Ouro Preto and Alfredo d'Escragnolle Taunay, and other writers and intellectuals, founded the Brazilian Academy of Letters. He was its first president, from 1897 to 1908, when he died. For many years, he requested that the government grant a proper headquarters to the Academy, which he managed to obtain in 1905. In 1902 he was transferred to the accountancy's directing board of the Ministry of Industry.

His wife Carolina Novais died on 20 October 1904, after 35 years of a "perfect married life". Feeling depressed and lonely, Machado died on 29 September 1908.

Narrative style

Machado's style is unique, and several literary critics have tried to describe it since 1897. He is considered by many the greatest Brazilian writer of all time, and one of the world's greatest novelists and short story writers. His chronicles do not share the same status. His poems are often misunderstood for the use of crude terms, sometimes associated to the pessimist style of Augusto dos Anjos, another Brazilian writer.
Machado de Assis was included on American literary critic Harold Bloom's list of the greatest 100 geniuses of literature, alongside writers such as Dante, Shakespeare and Cervantes. Bloom considers him the greatest black writer in Western literature; although, in Brazil, Machado is perceived as a Pardo. 

His works have been studied by critics in various countries of the world, such as Giuseppe Alpi (Italy), Lourdes Andreassi (Portugal), Albert Bagby Jr. (US), Abel Barros Baptista (Portugal), Hennio Morgan Birchal (Brazil), Edoardo Bizzarri (Italy), Jean-Michel Massa (France), Helen Caldwell (US), John Gledson (England), Adrien Delpech (France), Albert Dessau (Germany), Paul B. Dixon (US), Keith Ellis (US), Edith Fowke (Canada), Anatole France (France), Richard Graham (US), Pierre Hourcade (France), David Jackson (US), G. Reginald Daniel (US), Linda Murphy Kelley (US), John C. Kinnear, Alfred Mac Adam (US), Victor Orban (France), Daphne Patai (US), Houwens Post (Italy), Samuel Putnam (US), John Hyde Schmitt, Tony Tanner (England), Jack E. Tomlins (US), Carmelo Virgillo (US), Dieter Woll (Germany), August Willemsen (Netherlands) and Susan Sontag (US).

Critics are divided as to the nature of Machado de Assis's writing. Some, such as Abel Barros Baptista, classify Machado as a staunch anti-realist, and argue that his writing attacks Realism, aiming to negate the possibility of representation or the existence of a meaningful objective reality. Realist critics such as John Gledson are more likely to regard Machado's work as a faithful description of Brazilian reality—but one executed with daring innovative technique. In light of Machado's own statements, Daniel argues that Machado's novels represent a growing sophistication and daring in maintaining a dialogue between the aesthetic subjectivism of Romanticism (and its offshoots) and the aesthetic objectivism of Realism-Naturalism. Accordingly, Machado's earlier novels have more in common with a hybrid mid-19th-century current often referred to as "Romantic Realism." In addition, his later novels have more in common with another late 19th-century hybrid: literary Impressionism. Historians such as Sidney Chalhoub argue that Machado's prose constitutes an exposé of the social, political and economic dysfunction of late Imperial Brazil. Critics agree on how he used innovative techniques to reveal the contradictions of his society. Roberto Schwarz points out that Machado's innovations in prose narrative are used to expose the hypocrisies, contradictions, and dysfunction of 19th-century Brazil. Schwarz,  argues that Machado inverts many narrative and intellectual conventions to reveal the pernicious ends to which they are used. Thus we see critics reinterpret Machado according to their own designs or their perception of how best to validate him for their own historical moment. Regardless, his incisive prose shines through, able to communicate with readers from different times and places, conveying his ironic and yet tender sense of what we, as human beings, are.

Machado's literary style has inspired many Brazilian writers. His works have been adapted to television, theater, and cinema. In 1975 the Comissão Machado de Assis ("Machado de Assis Commission"), organized by the Brazilian Ministry of Education and Culture, organized and published critical editions of Machado's works, in 15 volumes. His main works have been translated into many languages. Great 20th-century writers such as Salman Rushdie, Cabrera Infante and Carlos Fuentes, as well as the American film director Woody Allen, have expressed their enthusiasm for his fiction. Despite the efforts and patronage of such well-known intellectuals as Susan Sontag, Harold Bloom, and Elizabeth Hardwick, Machado's books—the most famous of which are available in English in multiple translations—have never achieved large sales in the English-speaking world and he continues to be relatively unknown, even by comparison with other Latin American writers.

In his works, Machado appeals directly to the reader, breaking the so-called fourth wall.

List of works

Novels 
 1872 – Ressurreição (Resurrection)
 1874 – A Mão e a Luva (The Hand and the Glove)
 1876 – Helena
 1878 – Iaiá Garcia
 1881 – Memórias Póstumas de Brás Cubas (The Posthumous Memoirs of Bras Cubas, also known in English as Epitaph of a Small Winner)
 1891 – Quincas Borba (also known in English as Philosopher or Dog?)
 1899 – Dom Casmurro
 1904 – Esaú e Jacó (Esau and Jacob)
 1908 – Memorial de Aires (Counselor Ayres' Memorial)

Novellas 
 1881 – O alienista (The Psychiatrist, or The Alienist)
 1886 – Casa velha (published as a book in 1944)

Plays 
 1860 – Hoje avental, amanhã luva
 1861 – Desencantos
 1863 – O caminho da porta and O protocolo (two plays)
 1864 – Quase ministro
 1865 – As Forcas Caudinas (published 1956)
 1866 – Os deuses de casaca
 1878 – A Sonâmbula, Antes da Missa and O bote de rapé (three short plays)
 1881 – Tu, só tu, puro amor
 1896 – Não consultes médico
 1906 – Lição de botânica

Poetry 
 1864 – Crisálidas
 1870 – Falenas (including the dramatic poem Uma ode de anacreonte)
 1875 – Americanas
 1901 – Ocidentais
 1901 – Poesias Completas (complete poetry)

Short-story collections 
 1870 – Contos Fluminenses
 1873 – Histórias da meia-noite
 1882 – Papéis avulsos (including "O alienista")
 1884 – Histórias sem data
 1896 – Várias histórias
 1899 – Páginas recolhidas (including "A Missa do Galo" and "The Case of the Stick")
 1906 – Relíquias de Casa Velha

Translations 
 1861 – Queda que as mulheres têm para os tolos, from the original De l'amour des femmes pour les sots, by Victor Hénaux
 1865 – Suplício de uma mulher, from the original Le supplice d'une femme, by Émile de Girardin
 1866 – Os Trabalhadores do Mar, from the original Les Travailleurs de la mer, by Victor Hugo
 1870 – Oliver Twist, from the original Oliver Twist; or, the Parish Boy's Progress, by Charles Dickens
 1883 – O Corvo, from The Raven, a famous poem by Edgar Allan Poe

Posthumous 
 1910 – Teatro Coligido (collected plays)
 1910 – Crítica
 1914 – A Semana (collection of articles)
 1921 – Outras Relíquias (collection of short stories)
 1921 – Páginas Escolhidas (collection of short stories)
 1932 – Novas Relíquias (collection of short stories)
 1937 – Crônicas (articles)
 1937 – Crítica Literária 
 1937 – Crítica Teatral
 1937 – Histórias Românticas
 1939 – Páginas Esquecidas
 1944 – Casa Velha
 1956 – Diálogos e Reflexões de um Relojoeiro
 1958 – Crônicas de Lélio

Collected works

There are several published "Complete Works" of Machado de Assis:

 1920 – Obras Completas. Rio de Janeiro: Livraria Garnier (20 vols.)
 1962 – Obras Completas. Rio de Janeiro: W.M. Jackson (31 vols.)
 1997 – Obras Completas. Rio de Janeiro: Editora Globo (31 vols.)
 2006 – Obras Completas. Rio de Janeiro: Nova Aguilar (3 vols.)

Works in English translation
 1921 – Brazilian Tales. Boston: The Four Seas Company (London: Dodo Press, 2007).
 1952 – Epitaph of a Small Winner. New York: Noonday Press (London: Hogarth Press, 1985; republished as The Posthumous Memoirs of Brás Cubas: A Novel. New York: Oxford University Press, 1997; Epitaph of a Small Winner. New York: Farrar, Straus & Giroux, 2008; UK: Bloomsbury Publishing, 2008).
 1953 – Dom Casmurro: A Novel. New York: Noonday Press (Berkeley: University of California Press, 1966; republished as Dom Casmurro. Lord Taciturn. London: Peter Owen, 1992; Dom Casmurro: A Novel. New York: Oxford University Press, 1997).
 1954 – Philosopher or Dog? New York: Avon Books (republished as The Heritage of Quincas Borba. New York: W.H. Allen, 1957; New York: Farrar, Straus and Giroux, 1992; republished as Quincas Borba: A Novel. New York: Oxford University Press, 1998).
 1963 – The Psychiatrist, and Other Stories. Berkeley: University of California Press.
 1965 – Esau and Jacob. Berkeley: University of California Press.
 1970 – The Hand & the Glove. Lexington: University Press of Kentucky.
 1972 – Counselor Ayres' Memorial. Berkeley: University of California Press (republished as The Wager: Aires' Journal. London: Peter Owen, 1990; also republished as The Wager, 2005).
 1976 – Yayá Garcia: A Novel. London: Peter Owen (republished as Iaiá Garcia. Lexington: University Press of Kentucky, 1977).
 1977 – The Devil's Church and Other Stories. Austin: University of Texas Press (New York: HarperCollins Publishers Ltd, 1987).
 1984 – Helena: A Novel. Berkeley: University of California Press.
 2008 – A Chapter of Hats and Other Stories. London: Bloomsbury Publishing.
 2012 – The Alienist. New York: Melville House Publishing.
 2013 – Resurrection. Pennsylvania: Latin American Literary Review Press.
 2013 – The Alienist and Other Stories of Nineteenth-century Brazil. Indianapolis: Hackett Publishing.
 2014 – Ex Cathedra: Stories by Machado de Assis — Bilingual Edition. Hanover, Conn.: New London Librarium.
 2016 – Miss Dollar: Stories by Machado de Assis — Bilingual Edition. Hanover, Conn.: New London Librarium.
 2018 – Trio in A-Minor: Five Stories by Machado de Assis—Bilingual Edition. Hanover, Conn.: New London Librarium.
 2018 – The Collected Stories of Machado de Assis.  New York : Liveright & Company.
 2018 – Good Days!: The Bons Dias! Chronicles of Machado de Assis (1888-1889) — Bilingual Edition. Hanover, Conn.: New London Librarium.

Titles and honours

Titles
 Founding member of the Brazilian Academy of Letters (1896–1908).
 President of the Brazilian Academy of Letters (1897–1908).

Honours
 : Knight of the Order of the Rose (1867).
 : Officer of the Order of the Rose (1888).

Tribute
On June 21, 2017, Google celebrated his 178th birthday with a Google Doodle.

Notes

References
 Bueno, Eduardo (2003). Brasil: Uma História. 1ª ed. São Paulo: Ática. 
 Encilopédia Barsa (1987). Volume 10: "Judô – Mercúrio". Rio de Janeiro: Encyclopædia Britannica do Brasil. 
 Scarano, Júlia Maria Leonor (1969). Grandes Personagens da Nossa História. São Paulo: Abril Cultural. 
 Vainfas, Ronaldo (2002). Dicionário do Brasil Imperial. Rio de Janeiro: Objetiva.

Further reading

 Abreu, Modesto de (1939). Machado de Assis. Rio de Janeiro: Norte.
 Andrade, Mário (1943). Aspectos da Literatura Brasileira. Rio de Janeiro: Americ. Ed.
 Aranha, Graça (1923). Machado de Assis e Joaquim Nabuco: Comentários e Notas à Correspondência. São Paulo: Monteiro Lobato.
 Barreto Filho (1947). Introdução a Machado de Assis. Rio de Janeiro: Agir.
 Bettencourt Machado, José (1962). Machado of Brazil, the Life and Times of Machado de Assis, Brazil's Greatest Novelist. New York: Charles Frank Publications.
 Bosi, Alfredo. (Organizador) Machado de Assis. São Paulo: Editora Atica, 1982.
 Bosi, Alfredo (2000). Machado de Assis: O Enigma do Olhar. São Paulo: Ática.
 Broca, Brito (1957). Machado de Assis e a Política. Rio de Janeiro: Organização Simões Editora.
 Chalhoub, Sidney (2003). Machado de Assis, Historiador. São Paulo: Companhia das Letras.
 Cheney, et al. (editors) (2014) Ex Cathedra: Stories by Machado de Assis--Bilingual Edition. Hanover, CT:New London Librarium 
 Corção, Gustavo (1956). Machado de Assis. Rio de Janeiro: Agir.
 Coutinho, Afrânio (1959). A Filosofia de Machado de Assis e Outros Ensaios. Rio de Janeiro: São José. 
 Dantas, Júlio (1940). Machado de Assis. Lisboa: Academia das Ciências. 
 Dixon, Paul B. (1989). Retired Dreams: Dom Casmurro, Myth and Modernity. West Lafayette: Purdue University Press. 
 Faoro, Raimundo (1974). Machado de Assis: Pirâmide e o Trapézio. São Paulo: Cia. Ed. Nacional.
 Fitz, Earl E. (1989). Machado de Assis. Boston: Twayne Publishers. 
 Gledson, John (1984). The Deceptive Realism of Machado de Assis. Liverpool: Francis Cairns.
 Gledson, John (1986). Machado de Assis: Ficção e História. Rio de Janeiro: Paz & Terra.
 Goldberg, Isaac (1922). "Joaquim Maria Machado de Assis." In: Brazilian Literature. New York: Alfred A. Knoff, pp. 142–164.
 Gomes, Eugênio (1976). Influências Inglesas em Machado de Assis. Rio de Janeiro: Pallas; Brasília: INL.
 Graham, Richard (ed.). Machado de Assis: Reflections on a Brazilian Master Writer. Austin, TX: University of Texas Press, 1999.
 Lima, Alceu Amoroso (1941). Três Ensaios sobre Machado de Assis. Belo Horizonte: Paulo & Bruhm.
 Magalhães Jr, Raimundo (1981). Vida e Obra de Machado de Assis. Rio de Janeiro/Brasília: Civilização Brasileira/INL.
 Maia Neto, José Raimundo (1984). Machado de Assis, the Brazilian Pyrrhonian. West Lafayette, Ind.: Purdue University Press.
 Massa, Jean-Michel (1971). A Juventude de Machado de Assis. Rio de Janeiro: Civilização Brasileira.
 Merquior, José Guilherme (1971). "Machado de Assis e a Prosa Impressionista." In: De Anchieta a Euclides; Breve História da Literatura Brasileira. Rio de Janeiro: José Olympio, pp. 150–201. 
 Meyer, Augusto (1935). Machado de Assis. Porto Alegre: Globo.
 Meyer, Augusto (1958). Machado de Assis 1935–1958. Rio de Janeiro: Livraria São José.
 Montello, Jesué (1998). Os Inimigos de Machado de Assis. Rio de Janeiro: Editora Nova Fronteira.
 Nunes, Maria Luisa (1983). The Craft of an Absolute Winner: Characterization and Narratology in the Novels of Machado de Assis. Westport, Conn.: Greenwood Press.
 Paes, José Paulo. (1985). Gregos e Baianos: Ensaios. São Paulo: Brasiliense.
 Pereira, Astrogildo (1944). Interpretação. Rio de Janeiro: Casa do Estudante do Brasil.
 Miguel-Pereira, Lúcia (1936). Machado de Assis: Estudo Critíco e Biográfico. São Paulo: Cia. Ed. Nacional.
 Schwarz, Roberto (2000). Ao Vencedor as Batatas. São Paulo: Duas Cidades/Editora34.
 Schwarz, Roberto (1997). Duas Meninas. São Paulo: Companhia das Letras.
 Schwarz, Roberto (1990). Um Mestre na Periferia do Capitalismo. São Paulo: Duas Cidades. Trans. as A Master on the Periphery of Capitalism. Trans. and intro. John Gledson. Durham: Duke UP, 2001.
 Taylor, David (2002). "Wry Modernist of Brazil's Past." Américas, Nov.-Dec., issue. Washington, DC.
 Veríssimo, José (1916). História da Literatura Brasileira. Rio de Janeiro: Livrarias Aillaud & Bertrand.

External links

  Machado de Assis at Brasialiana, University of São Paulo (digitalized first editions of all the books in PDF)
  Complete Works of Machado de Assis – Brazilian Ministry of Education
  MetaLibri Digital Library
 Contos Fluminenses
 Dom Casmurro
 Memórias Póstumas de Bras Cubas
 Quincas Borba
 
  Machado de Assis a literary biography.
  Books of Machado de Assis in Biblioteca Virtual do Estudante de Língua Portuguesa.
 Manuscrito de Machado de Assis – Handwritten pieces
 Espaço Machado de Assis
 João Cezar de Castro Rocha, "Introduction: Machado de Assis, the Location of an Author"
 
 
 

 
1839 births
1908 deaths
Brazilian monarchists
Brazilian male novelists
19th-century Brazilian dramatists and playwrights
Brazilian male dramatists and playwrights
19th-century Brazilian poets
Brazilian male poets
Brazilian male short story writers
Brazilian translators
Members of the Brazilian Academy of Letters
19th-century Brazilian novelists
20th-century Brazilian novelists
Brazilian people of Azorean descent
Writers from Rio de Janeiro (city)
Portuguese-language writers
Translators to Portuguese
19th-century Brazilian short story writers
Brazilian people of African descent
19th-century Brazilian male writers
Afro-Brazilian people